Ten Eyewitness News Late was an Australian late night television news program, broadcast on Network Ten and it aired at 10.30pm on weeknights. The bulletin was hosted by Hugh Riminton with sport presented by Victoria Murphy.

Presenters

History
Network Ten began airing national late night news bulletins as part of the network's coverage of the First Gulf War in January 1991, which made extensive use of its rights to carry CNN material. Originally called Ten Evening News: Crisis in the Gulf, the bulletin's first host was veteran newsreader Eric Walters, who was also presenting the 6pm weeknight bulletin in Sydney at the time.

Walters presented Ten Late News for four months, after which, Good Morning Australia news presenter Anne Fulwood took over as presenter of what had now become Ten Second Edition News. The program's straightforward style and format was a clear point of difference with competing programs on rival networks, Seven's chat show Tonight Live with Steve Vizard (which included short news bulletins) and Nine's The World Tonight with Clive Robertson, quickly drawing attention and viewers. Ten's late night news would gradually introduce its own elements including business reports with Robert Gottliebsen and weather forecasts with Ray Wilkie.

Over the next few years, rival networks introduced their own late night news programs, such as the Nine Network's Nightline and Seven Nightly News: Late Edition, initially competing directly with Ten's bulletin. In November 1995, Anne Fulwood resigned from Network Ten to join the Seven Network to present Seven Nightly News: Late Edition - her replacement was Sandra Sully, who would go on to host Ten Late News for most of the next 16 years.

Ten Late News also aired on weekend evenings at around 11pm, hosted by Tracey Spicer for more than a decade, until the axing of the Saturday edition in 2004 and the Sunday edition a year later. At the time, Network Ten were the only network in Australia to broadcast a late night news program at weekends, whilst other networks would continue to air updates until mid to late evening. In 2006, the bulletin was merged with the late weeknight edition of Sports Tonight on Monday - Thursday and presented by Brad McEwan. Charmaine Dragun (co-host of Ten News at Five in Perth) was a regular presenter of the Friday edition of the Late News from 2005 until her sudden death in November 2007 - her replacement was Kathryn Robinson.

In September 2011, the network announced that due to declining ratings and increased competition, the bulletin would be axed. The last edition of Ten Late News, presented by Tim Webster, aired on Friday 30 September 2011. However, the final Monday - Thursday (Sandra Sully & Brad McEwan) Bulletin aired the previous day on Thursday 29 September 2011. Main host Sandra Sully became co-host of Sydney's Ten News at Five, replacing Deborah Knight.

The bulletin was revived on 4 June 2012 in a new magazine-style format, presented by Hamish Macdonald it is very different from the former Late News format but unique in how it is presented and what it entails. It starts off with an introduction by the host; then the national news with the news presenter; a major report - introduced by the host; various feature stories; occasional interviews; special segments throughout the week, including Entertainment with Angela Bishop; Sport; Twitter or Internet news and a Music item to conclude.

In September 2013, Danielle Isdale replaced Hamish Macdonald after he resigned and the bulletin was rebranded as Ten Eyewitness News: Late.

In February 2014, Network Ten announced that Hugh Riminton would replace Danielle Isdale as presenter, and Victoria Murphy would become the sports presenter. The format would return to a standard bulletin instead of the magazine-style previously used.

Fill in presenters include Sandra Sully (News) and Matt Suleau (Sport).

In late May 2014, in a move by the Ten Network to make budget cuts, Ten Eyewitness News Late was axed.

Australian television news shows
Network 10 original programming
10 News First
2000s Australian television series
1991 Australian television series debuts
2011 Australian television series endings
2012 Australian television series debuts
2014 Australian television series endings
Television shows set in Sydney
English-language television shows